Robert Law (born 16 October 1997) is a Canadian international lawn and indoor bowler.

Bowls career

World Championships
In 2020 he was selected for the 2020 World Outdoor Bowls Championship in Australia.

Commonwealth Games
In 2022, he competed in the men's triples and the men's fours at the 2022 Commonwealth Games.

Asia Pacific
Law won two bronze medals at the 2019 Asia Pacific Bowls Championships, in the pairs with Ryan Bester and the fours, held in the Gold Coast, Queensland.

References

External links
 Rob Law at Bowls Canada
 

1997 births
Living people
Canadian male bowls players
Commonwealth Games competitors for Canada
Bowls players at the 2022 Commonwealth Games
20th-century Canadian people
21st-century Canadian people